Top Gun is a 1986 feature film starring Tom Cruise.

Top Gun may also refer to:

Military 
 Top gunner, a gunner in the top turret of a military aircraft
 TopGun (artillery), a guidance kit
 United States Navy Strike Fighter Tactics Instructor program, better known as Top Gun (often stylized as TOPGUN or Topgun)
 "Top Gun", the highest-scoring individual or crew in a military gunnery course or competition, for example,

Entertainment 
 Top Gun (franchise), a multimedia franchise
 Top Gun: Maverick, 2022 sequel to the 1986 film
 Top Gun (soundtrack), the soundtrack to the 1986 film
 Top Gun: Maverick (soundtrack), the soundtrack to the 2022 film
 List of Top Gun video games, games based on the original film
 Top Gun (1955 film), a Western starring Sterling Hayden

Roller coasters 
 Flight Deck (California's Great America), in California, previously known as Top Gun
 Flight Deck (Canada's Wonderland), in Canada, previously known as Top Gun
 The Bat (Kings Island; opened 1993) in Ohio, previously known as Top Gun

Other 
 Fidel Sierra (born 1960), Cuban professional wrestler
 Stephen McKeag (1970–2000), commander in the UVF, nicknamed Top Gun for his prowess in killing Nationalist civilians